Aeschines was an Athenian orator, one of ten Attic orators.

Aeschines or Aischines may also refer to:

 Aeschines of Miletus, lesser known orator, and contemporary of Cicero
 Aeschines of Neapolis (c. 110 BC), academic philosopher
 Aeschines (physician), physician who lived in the latter half of the 4th century
 Aeschines of Sphettus (or Aeschines Socraticus), follower of Socrates and author of Socratic dialogues
 Aeschines, one of the Thirty Tyrants

See also